Youngsport is an unincorporated community in Bell County, in the U.S. state of Texas. According to the Handbook of Texas, the community had a population of 40 in 2000. It is located within the Killeen-Temple-Fort Hood metropolitan area.

History
A man named Michael Young moved to the area with his family sometime before 1850. A wagon train led by Joel Cosper added 106 new settlers to the community in 1870. A post office was established at Youngsport in 1871 and remained in operation until 1930. It was most likely named for P.G. Young, owner of the local hotel in 1884, or for Michael Young himself, who supposedly named the area "Young's port" when he arrived as the first settler and was the captain of a ship. Live Oak Baptist Church was established in 1875. In 1882, a Church of Christ congregation met in a brush arbor and built another building in either 1925 or 1926, while a new one was completed in 1988. The community had 200 residents supported by three churches, two cotton gins, a hotel, flour and corn mills, and was a shipping port for cotton. Youngsport also served a Grange chapter and a Woodmen's lodge in the early 1900s. It lost half of its population in 1890 and continued to go down to some 70 residents by 1914. The population was 50 in 1948 with two churches and businesses. Youngsport's population ended at 40 from 1988 through 2000 and had no more businesses in operation.

Geography

Climate
The climate in this area is characterized by hot, humid summers and generally mild to cool winters. According to the Köppen Climate Classification system, Youngsport has a humid subtropical climate, abbreviated "Cfa" on climate maps.

Education
Youngport's first school was reported to have begun operation in 1886 and was used as a meeting place for a local Church of Christ congregation for many years. In 1905, it had 77 students and two teachers and was one of the largest schools in the county in the early 20th century. It then joined the Killeen Independent School District in 1938. Today, the community is served by the Florence Independent School District.

Notable person
 A.C. Greene's grandmother, Maude E. Cole, was born in Youngsport.

References

Unincorporated communities in Texas
Unincorporated communities in Bell County, Texas